The Department of Fire and Emergency Services (DFES) is a government department that is responsible for fire and emergency services in Western Australia. The department came into being in 2012 as a result of the Perth Hills Bush Fire review.DFES is responsible for the management, training and funding of career and volunteer Services including:
 The Bush Fire Service (BFS)
 Volunteer Fire and Rescue Service (VFRS)
 Career Fire and Rescue Service (CFRS or FRS)
 Volunteer Fire and Emergency Service (VFES)
 State Emergency Service (SES)
 Volunteer Marine Rescue Service (VMRS)

History 
The DFES was formerly known as the Fire and Emergency Services Authority of Western Australia (FESA), a statutory government authority created in January 1999 to administer the following legislation within the state of Western Australia:
 Fire and Emergency Services Authority of Western Australia Act 1998
 Fire Brigades Act 1942
 Bush Fires Act 1954
 Emergency Services Levy Act 2002
 Emergency Management Act 2005

In the July 2017 Western Australian machinery of government changes, the department remained unaffected.

Fire and Rescue Service of Western Australia 
The inaugural meeting of the Fire Brigades' Board was held on 16 January 1899. This later led to the establishment of the Western Australian Fire Brigades' Board in 1909. WA Fire Brigades updated their name in 1995 to the Fire and Rescue Service of Western Australia, to more accurately reflect the service provided to the communities of Western Australia.

In 1999, with the creation of FESA, brought together the Fire and Rescue Service, and the Bush Fire Service to form the Fire Services Division of FESA. The Fire and Rescue Service and Bush Fire Service actively maintain their original identities.

The Department of Fire and Emergency Services was established in 2012 and replaced FESA. The first Fire and Emergency Commissioner Wayne Gregson was appointed. Wayne Gregson is a former WA Police Assistant Commissioner. A new state of the art headquarters is located at Stockton Bend, Cockburn Central. This building includes the state and metropolitan operations centres, statewide communications centre, operations/capability commands and corporate services.

Structure 

DFES operates under the Emergency Services Minister of the Government of WA and is the Hazard Management Agency (HMA) for cyclones, floods, storms, tsunami, structural collapse, HAZMAT incidents, earthquakes and fire. Their operational branch comprises Metropolitan Operations, Country Operations and Operations Capability and oversees the following services:

The Career Fire and Rescue Service of Western Australia (FRS or CFRS) consists of 1,190 paid firefighters working from 25 metropolitan stations and 4 country stations.

The Volunteer Fire and Rescue Service (VFRS) is a volunteer service predominantly attending motor vehicle accidents, structure fires and HAZMAT incidents outside of metropolitan areas. In 2019 the VFRS had 2,371 volunteer firefighters in 94 brigades across the state.

The Bush Fire Service (BFS) is a volunteer service tasked with attending any fire outside of a gazetted fire district within a brigade's local government area. They predominantly combat bushfires and conduct hazard reduction burning on a local level. As of 2019, there are 566 Bush Fire Brigades (BFBs) with 19,521 volunteers.

The Volunteer Fire and Emergency Services (VFES) is also a volunteer service. It was established to combine the resources of any combination of a BFS Brigade, a VFRS Brigade, VMRS Group or an SES Unit to replace the Volunteer Fire Services (VFS) and Volunteer Emergency Service (VES) in 2016 It has just over 1,000 volunteers as of 2019.

The State Emergency Service  (SES) is a volunteer service with the role of attending a vast array of natural disasters and search and rescue incidents. They attend land searches for missing people, storm damage, urban search and rescue (USAR), cliff rescue, road crash rescue, transporting personnel and equipment to fires as well as many other roles. The SES has a K9 unit with volunteer's dogs being trained in searching for missing people and a mounted unit for land searches. As of 2019 they had 1,839 volunteers.

The Volunteer Marine Rescue Service (VMRS) is another volunteer service tasked with assisting the Western Australian Police with searches for missing people or vessels, assisting disabled vessels and rescues in water around the state. As of 2019 there are 39 VMRS Groups with 1,752 volunteers.

In April 2018 a new Rural Fire Division was announced after the findings of the 2016 Waroona Bushfire Special Inquiry. It will be another branch under the DFES structure and will consist of:
 Bushfire Centre of Excellence (training and research into Bushfire mitigation)
 Bushfire Risk Management Planning
 Bushfire Technical Services
 Land Use Planning
 Office of Bushfire Risk Management

Stations

Metropolitan Career fire stations

 Armadale
 Belmont (new station opened 3 November 2005, old station 1974–2005)
 Butler
 Byford (Commencing in 2022)
 Canning Vale
 Claremont
 Cockburn (Opened Jan 2021, replaced Success)
 Daglish
 Duncraig
 Ellenbrook
 Fremantle

 Hope Valley (opened 2 November 2005)
 Joondalup
 Kensington (new station expected operational in April 2021, old station 1973–2021)
 Kiara
 Maddington
 Malaga
 Mandurah
 Midland

 Murdoch
 Osborne Park
 Perth (The original station, closed in 1979, operates as a museum.)
 Rockingham
 Success (Station Closed, replaced by Cockburn in January 2021)
 Vincent – Opened in May 2018.
 Wangara
 Welshpool

Country Career fire stations

 Geraldton
 Kalgoorlie
 Albany
 Bunbury

Vehicles and equipment
The Department maintains and coordinates a range of specialist equipment and emergency response vehicles. This includes pumpers and tankers, aerial ladders and other equipment designed to combat incidents including search and rescue, urban search and rescue (USAR), 
firefighting and other natural disasters.

Appliances used by DFES brigades groups and units include:

BFS/VFES/VFRS/CFRS vehicles 

 Light Tanker (Toyota Landcruiser 70 Series V8 single cab ute with a diesel pump and water capacity of approximately 550L)
 1.4R (Rural)
 2.4B (Broadacre) / 2.4R
 3.4U (Urban)
 4.4B / 4.4R
 12.2 Bulk Water Tanker
 Incident Control Vehicle (ICV)
 Combination Ladder Platform (CLP)
 Urban Pump
 Urban Pump Type 2 (Previously Country Pump)
 Urban Pump Type 3 (Previously HSR. A 4x4 offroad capable appliance designed to combat HAZMAT incidents, structure fires and rescue operations)
 Vertical Rescue Vehicle

SES/VFES Vehicles 

 Personnel Carrier (Toyota Landcruiser 70 Series V8 Troop Carrier used to transport personnel and equipment to incidents)
 General Rescue (GR) Truck (Isuzu NPS 75-155/NPR 75-190 used to transport rescue/communications equipment to incidents)
 12 Seater Bus
 Road Crash Rescue Tender (Same platform as GR Truck)
 Flood Rescue Boat

Aerial Suppression and Fire Mapping 
DFES utilises a range of water bombing and surveillance aircraft on loan from various companies and in collaboration with The Department of Biodiversity, Conservation and Attractions (DBCA) Parks and Wildlife Service. During the 2019/2020 Fire season, these include:
 Bell 214B Helitaks with a 2700L capacity
 Sikorsky S-64 Erickson Skycrane with a 7000L Capacity
 Air Tractor 802 with a capacity of 3100L (operated by DBCA Parks and Wildlife Service)
 Eurocopter AS355 Écureuil (Air attack supervision and fire mapping)
 Eurocopter AS365 Dauphin (Utility, air attack supervision and fire mapping, capacity for water bombing with 1200L bucket)
MD-87 (Large Air Tanker based at RAAF Pearce)

Vehicles are named based on their water capacity, drive type (2x4/4x4) and role. For example: 1.4R meaning approximately 1000L, 4x4 and designed for a rural environment.

Incidents
In February 2023, a Coulson Aviation Boeing 737-300 crashed while fighting fires in Fitzgerald River National Park; both pilots survived the crash.

Publications
DFES publishes 24seven, a magazine.

See also
 Australasian Fire and Emergency Service Authorities Council

References

 
Emergency services in Western Australia
Fire
Fire and rescue services of Australia
2012 establishments in Australia
Government agencies established in 2012